The Scripps Mansion (originally called Moulton Manor) is a Norman/Tudor Revival style mansion located in Orion Township, Michigan. The buildings and surrounding land are known collectively as the William E. Scripps Estate.

Since 1956, the property has been part of the campus of Guest House, a residential treatment center for Catholic clergy. The estate was added to the National Register of Historic Places in 2007.

History
The mansion was built in 1927 for William Edmund Scripps and his family. Scripps, the founder of the WWJ radio station (and son of the founder of the Detroit News), had initially established a farm on the property as a "hobby", before eventually settling there. It is currently not open to the public due to ongoing repairs, but tours and events have been offered in the past to showcase the  interior design and garden.

At its peak, the farm featured Angus cattle, cows, swine, sheep, and poultry. During the Depression years, the farmhands and mansion servants all lived on the property. A small one-room schoolhouse for children of farm employees was established in 1925, and in 1952, it was converted into an Episcopalian church.

Amelia Earhart, at the request of Scripps, flew an experimental glider at the property in 1929. Scripps, a pilot himself, became a glider enthusiast and formed his own company (Gliders, Inc.) in 1929. He began his venture by manufacturing a primary type glider.

Today
Scripps died in 1952, and much of the farm was sold at auction.  A large part of the collection of European paintings from the estate was donated to the Detroit Institute of Arts in 1956.

The farmland and lakes are now mostly parks for Orion Township, Oakland County, and the state of Michigan (Civic Center Park, Orion Oaks and Bald Mountain Recreation Area, respectively). Some of the former farm buildings were converted into the Canterbury Village shopping center.

The airstrip and field used by Earhart is now used as an area for radio controlled airplanes as part of Bald Mountain Recreation Area.

References

External links

 Guest House – History of Scripps Mansion
 William E. Scripps Estate

Houses in Oakland County, Michigan
National Register of Historic Places in Oakland County, Michigan
Scripps family